Transrealism may refer to:
Transrealism (literature)
Poetic transrealism